Bulmer is a village and civil parish in the Ryedale district of North Yorkshire, England. According to the 2001 census it had a population of 174, increasing to 202 at the census 2011.

History

Bulmer was the seat of the ancient wapentake of the same name, known as the Bulford wapentake in 1086. The name Bulmer comes from "bull mere," a lake frequented by a bull.

The manor is listed in the Domesday Book of 1086. It is recorded as having been held in 1066 by a Northmann and Ligulf. It was awarded by the King with hundreds of others to his half-brother Count Robert de Mortain, whose tenant was Nigel Fossard.

The Bulmer family take their name from Bulmer. Ansketil de Bulmer is the first recorded member of the Bulmer family, who lived in the area in the twelfth century. By the nineteenth century the lordship of the manor had passed to the Earls of Carlisle, whose residence was at nearby Castle Howard. A monument to George William Frederick Howard can be found on top of Bulmer Hill just outside the village.

Governance

The village lies within the Thirsk and Malton UK Parliament constituency. It is also within the Hovingham and Sheriff Hutton electoral division of North Yorkshire County Council. It is part of the Derwent ward of Ryedale District Council.

Geography

The nearest settlements are Welburn  to the west; Sheriff Hutton  to the east; Terrington  to the north-east and Whitwell-on-the-Hill  to the south-east.

To the west of the village is Bulmer Beck that runs southwards to eventually join the River Derwent.

In the late nineteenth century the population was recorded as 231, which has decreased to 174 according to the 2001 UK Census. Of the total population, 143 were over the age of sixteen, with 77 in full-time employment. The 2001 UK Census showed that there were 78 dwellings in the village.

Village amenities 

Visually, the village has changed little during history; however the small village school at the bottom of School Lane is now the village hall. The village also used to be home to a pub, blacksmith, shop and agricultural engineering workshop; these are all now closed.

Primary education can be found in the nearby villages of Sheriff Hutton, Welburn, Terrington and Thornton-le-Clay. Secondary Education can be found at Malton School or Norton College.

Religion

There is a church in the village, dedicated to St Martin, a soldier saint and Bishop of Tours. This Grade I listed building dates from around the 11th century, and services are held once every Sunday. The church contains the last remaining tablet of a Methodist chapel, which used to be present in the village and was built around 1842.

The ecclesiastical parish of Bulmer includes Castle Howard.

References

External links

Villages in North Yorkshire
Civil parishes in North Yorkshire